Espinosa is a municipality in the north of the state of Minas Gerais, Brazil. Its population was 32,151 (2015) and its area is 1,869 km². The elevation is 572 meters.  

The municipality contains part of the  Caminho dos Gerais State Park, created in 2007.
Espinosa belongs to the IBGE microregion of Janaúba. It is connected to that city by BR-122. It is a short distance south of the boundary with the state of Bahia. 

The main economic activities are cattle raising, small transformation industries, and agriculture. In 2006, there were 32,000 head of cattle. The main agricultural crops were cotton, sugarcane, corn, and sorghum. In 2007 there were two financial institutions. The GDP (2005)was R$ 84,238,000. There was one hospital with 32 beds (2005). There were 1,485 automobiles in 2007, a ratio of one automobile for every 21 inhabitants.

Municipal Human Development Index
MHDI: .657 (2000)
State ranking: 721 out of 853 municipalities
National ranking: 3,661 out of 5,138 municipalities
Life expectancy: 67
Literacy rate: 70 For the complete list see Frigoletto

See also
List of municipalities in Minas Gerais

References

City government site--little useful information
IBGE

Municipalities in Minas Gerais